Biharilal Bishnoi (born 25 August 1979) is a member of the Rajasthan Legislative Assembly. He is a member of the Bharatiya Janata Party, and represents the Nokha assembly constituency in Bikaner District.

Political life

Biharilal won the election from Nokha for the first time in 2018. Even before that, he faced defeat twice in 2008 and 2013.

See also
Rameshwar Lal Dudi
Bhanwar Singh Bhati
Girdharilal Mahiya
Devi Singh Bhati
Narayan Beniwal
Hanuman Beniwal
Bulaki Das Kalla

External links

References

1981 births
Living people
Bharatiya Janata Party politicians from Rajasthan
Rajasthani people
Rajasthani politicians
Leaders of the Opposition in Rajasthan
People from Bikaner district
Rajasthan MLAs 2018–2023